Summative assessment, summative evaluation, or assessment of learning is the assessment of participants in an educational program. Summative assessments are designed to both assess the effectiveness of the program and the learning of the participants. This contrasts with formative assessment, which summarizes the participants' development at a particular time in order to inform instructors of student learning progress.

The goal of summative assessment is to evaluate student learning at the end of an instructional unit by comparing it against a standard or benchmark. Summative assessments may be distributed throughout a course or often after a particular unit (or collection of topics) . Summative assessment usually involves students receiving a grade that indicates their level of performance. Grading systems can include a percentage, pass/fail, or some other form of scale grade. Summative assessments are weighted more than formative assessments.

Summative assessments are often high stakes, which means that they have a high point value. Examples of summative assessments include: a midterm exam, a final project, a paper, a senior recital, or another format.

Instructional design

Summative assessment is used as an evaluation technique in instructional design. It can provide information on the efficacy of an educational unit of study. Summative evaluation judges the worth, or value, of an educational unit of study at its conclusion. Summative assessments also serve the purpose of evaluating student learning. In schools, these assessments can be in a variety of formats: traditional written tests, essays, presentations, discussions, or reports using other formats. There are several factors for designers of summative assessments to take into account. A summative assessment must have validity. That is, it must evaluate the standards or learning objectives that were taught over the course of the unit. Second, a summative assessment must be reliable: the results of the assessment should be consistent. In other words, the assessment should be designed to be as objective as possible, though this can be challenging in certain disciplines. 
 
Summative assessments are usually given at the end of a unit, and they are usually high stakes with the grade being weighted more heavily than formative assessments taken during the unit. Many educators and school administrators use data from summative assessments to help identify learning gaps. This information can come from both summative assessments taken in the classroom or from district-wide, school-wide or statewide standardized tests. Once educators and administrators have student summative assessment data, many districts place students into educational interventions or enrichment programs. Intervention programs are designed to teach students skills in which they are not yet proficient in order to help them make progress and lessen learning gaps. Enrichment programs are designed to challenge students who have mastered many skills and have high summative assessment scores.

Educator performance

Summative assessment can be used to refer to assessment of educational faculty by their respective supervisor, with the object of measuring all teachers on the same criteria to determine the level of their performance. In this context summative assessment is meant to meet the school or district's needs for teacher accountability. The evaluation usually takes the shape of a form, and consists of check lists and occasionally narratives. Areas evaluated include classroom climate, instruction, professionalism, and planning and preparation.

Methods
Methods of summative assessment aim to summarize overall learning at the completion of the course or unit.
 Questionnaires
 Surveys
 Interviews
 Observations
 Testing (specific test created by the teacher or establishment made to include all points of a unit or specific information taught in a given time frame)
 Projects (a culminating project that synthesizes knowledge)

See also
 Examination
 Educational assessment
 Formative assessment
 Computer-aided assessment
 Types of assessment

References

Educational evaluation methods
Educational psychology
School terminology